The Buckskin Mountains is a mountain range in La Paz County, Arizona, United States. The range lies just east of the north–south Colorado River, and borders south of the east–west, west-flowing Bill Williams River.

Description
The range is part of a three-range sequence of mildly arc-shaped ranges, and two intermountain valleys in the Maria fold and thrust belt, a region in western Arizona and southeast Southern California, with the Colorado River flowing south through the western part of the belt. The fold-and-thrust-belt region contains numerous plains, valleys, and mountain ranges, about 30 landforms in all.

The Buckskin Mountains also extend west into a section abutting the Colorado River. Buckskin Mountain State Park borders the south of the Bill Williams River.

Buckskin Mountains: west, central, and southeast

The southeast section of the Buckskin Mountains are part of a three-mountain range thrust-faulted system, with the Harcuvar and Harquahala Mountains. The highest peak in the section is Battleship Peak, at the southwest end, and directly northeast of Bouse in the Ranegras Plain, and the Bouse Wash Drainage.

The west end of the mountains abut the north–south Colorado River.

The entire north perimeter of the range is the Bill Williams River. Buckskin Mountain State Park is at its confluence in the northwest at the Colorado River. Abutting the Bill Williams in the center is the Swansea Wilderness; the northeast contains the Rawhide Mountains Wilderness on both sides of the river. The northeast of the range borders Alamo Lake State Park-(Alamo Lake), which also borders the Rawhide Mountains on the lake's northwest.

Planet Peak is directly adjacent at the northeast of the Cactus Plain and the East Cactus Plain Wilderness. It is known to locals as "P Mountain" due to the large white "P" painted on its west side by the nearby town of Parker.

Three major thrust-faulted ranges
The major mountain ranges that are thrusted northwesterly in the Maria fold and thrust belt region are, from north to south:

 Buckskin Mountains
 Butler Valley (Arizona)
 Harcuvar Mountains
 McMullen Valley
 Harquahala Mountains

Some of the thirty landforms in the fold-and-thrust-belt listed in a circular path around these three ranges are: 1. NE, Alamo Lake State Park, NE Buckskin Mtns; 2. Access roads from U.S. Route 93, northwest, dirt, and southwest, Arizona State Route 71 terminating at Aguila, Arizona, at the northeast of the Harquahala's; 3. Southeast of the Harquahalas, three mountain ranges, and the Hassayampa and Harquahala Plains-(Harquahala Valley); 4. The southwest and west perimeter of the three ranges is the Bouse Wash Drainage; the drainage is in the Ranegras Plain, but two small ranges, and the Bouse Hills abut the perimeter as well; 5. The northwest abuts the Cactus Plain and the Cactus Plain Wilderness; 6. The northwest also has the Buckskin Mountains extending into a western section at the confluence of the Colorado and Bill Williams Rivers. Buckskin Mountain State Park is located here. 7. The Bill Williams River downstream from Alamo Lake State Park is the northern border of the three ranges, as well as the de facto border of fold-and-thrust-belt. The river is also a dividing line between the Mojave Desert north and northwest, and the Sonoran Desert, south and southeast; in California, the Colorado Desert subsection of the Sonoran Desert lies southwest.

See also

 List of mountain ranges of Arizona

References

External links

 Buckskin Mountains, at Mountainzone
 Battleship Peak, Mountainzona
 Buckskin Mountains, (Battleship Peak area), etc, mines and minerals

Mountain ranges of the Sonoran Desert
Mountain ranges of La Paz County, Arizona
Mountain ranges of the Lower Colorado River Valley
Mountain ranges of Arizona